The Mohawk Building is a building located in downtown Portland, Oregon, listed on the National Register of Historic Places.

See also
 National Register of Historic Places listings in Southwest Portland, Oregon

References

External links
 

1903 establishments in Oregon
Buildings and structures completed in 1903
Colonial Revival architecture in Oregon
National Register of Historic Places in Portland, Oregon
Southwest Portland, Oregon
Portland Historic Landmarks